Trees (stylised as TREES) is the second studio album by Avantdale Bowling Club, the solo project of New Zealand rapper Tom Scott. Released in September 2022, the album debuted at number one on the Official New Zealand Music Chart.

Production

Scott worked together with former At Peace bandmate Christoph El Truento to create the album. The pair worked to create a more modern sound on the album compared to the debut Avantdale Bowling Club album from 2018, by incorporating auto-tune, newer drum machines and accordion.

Release and promotion

As a part of the 2022 New Zealand International Film Festival, Scott released Trees, an 18-minute short film directed by Scott that depicts a dystopian world where trees have been banned. The film starred Bruce Hopkins, and was scored by Avantdale Bowling Club. Scott toured New Zealand in November and December 2022, performing six dates including performances at the Auckland Town Hall and the St. James Theatre, Wellington.

Critical reception

Everything Is Noise chose Trees as one of their top 75 albums of 2022, while Hip-Hop Golden Age chose Trees as the 14th best hip-hop album of 2022, praising the album as "an effortless fusion of neo-jazz and Hip Hop", noting that "Trees is more subtle and humble than Avantdale Bowling Club's eponymous masterpiece debut".

Track listing

Credits and personnel

Tom Broome – recording (2)
Cory Champion – drums, vibraphone
Tom Dennison – additional bass
Julien Dyne – drums
Christoph El Truento – mixer, producer
Guy Harrison – keyboards, trumpet
Brandon Haru – keyboards
Daniel Hayles – keyboards
Haz Beats – producer (2)
Hershel Hersche – accordion
Troy Kingi – additional vocals
Ben Lawson – mixer, recording engineer
Jong-Yung Lee – saxophone
Parks – keyboards
Rizvan – additional vocals
Tom Scott – concept, vocals
Manhit Singh – tabla 
Hollie Smith – additional vocals
Dallas Tamaira – additional vocals
Mara TK – additional vocals, guitar, sitar
Jeremy Toy – additional guitar
Lui Tuiasau – additional vocals
Ben Turua – bass
Tonga Vaea – additional vocals

Charts

Weekly charts

Year-end charts

Release history

References

2022 albums
Jazz albums by New Zealand artists
Hip hop albums by New Zealand artists